The 1962 New Hampshire gubernatorial election was held on November 6, 1962. Democratic nominee John W. King defeated Republican nominee John Pillsbury with 58.89% of the vote.

Primary elections
Primary elections were held on September 11, 1962.

Candidates 
John W. King, State Representative
Elmer E. Bussey

Results

Republican primary

Candidates
John Pillsbury
Wesley Powell, incumbent Governor
Walter L. Koenig

Results

General election

Candidates
John W. King, Democratic
John Pillsbury, Republican

Results

References

1962
New Hampshire
Gubernatorial